The castra of Costești was a fort in the Roman province of Dacia. Erected and abandoned by the Romans at an uncertain date, its ruins are located in Costești (commune Orăștioara de Sus, Romania) on a hilltop, at an altitude of 1203 meters.

Archeologist Aurora Peţan claims this fortification could be a Dacian hill fort because its shape is irregular, the ditch is inside fortification, only Dacian pottery was found during the excavations, and it is placed on a strategic defense location - common to Dacian fortresses.

See also
List of castra

External links
Roman castra from Romania - Google Maps / Earth

Notes

Roman legionary fortresses in Romania
Ancient history of Transylvania
Historic monuments in Hunedoara County